In mathematics, a metric space aimed at its subspace is a categorical construction that has a direct geometric meaning.  It is also a useful step toward the construction of the metric envelope, or tight span, which are basic (injective) objects of the category of metric spaces.

Following , a notion of a metric space Y aimed at its subspace X is defined.

Informal introduction 
Informally, imagine terrain Y, and its part X, such that wherever in Y you place a sharpshooter, and an apple at another place in Y, and then let the sharpshooter fire, the bullet will go through the apple and will always hit a point of X, or at least it will fly arbitrarily close to points of X – then we say that Y is aimed at X.

A priori, it may seem plausible that for a given X the superspaces Y that aim at X can be arbitrarily large or at least huge.  We will see that this is not the case. Among the spaces which aim at a subspace isometric to X, there is a unique (up to isometry) universal one, Aim(X), which in a sense of canonical isometric embeddings contains any other space aimed at (an isometric image of) X. And in the special case of an arbitrary compact metric space X every bounded subspace of an arbitrary metric space Y aimed at X is totally bounded (i.e. its metric completion is compact).

Definitions 
Let  be a metric space. Then

Define

Then

Furthermore, where , is an isometric embedding of  into ; this is essentially a generalisation of the Kuratowski-Wojdysławski embedding of bounded metric spaces  into , where we here consider arbitrary metric spaces (bounded or unbounded).

Properties 
Let  be an isometric embedding. Then there exists a natural metric map  such that :

Theorem The space Y above is aimed at subspace X if and only if the natural mapping  is an isometric embedding.

Thus it follows that every space aimed at X can be isometrically mapped into Aim(X), with some additional (essential) categorical requirements satisfied.

The space Aim(X) is injective (hyperconvex in the sense of Aronszajn-Panitchpakdi) – given a metric space M, which contains Aim(X) as a metric subspace, there is a canonical (and explicit) metric retraction of M onto Aim(X) .

References

Metric geometry